Birtha may refer to the following:

Places 
 Birtha (Mesopotamia), on the Tigris, now at Tikrit, Iraq
 early Ancient name of the later Palmyran city Zenobia, now Halabiye, in Syria
 Birecik, modern name of Birtha on the Euphrates, Turkey
 Birtha (Thapsacus), near Thapsacus, location not precisely known

Other 
 Birtha (moth), a moth genus
 Birtha (band), an all-female hard rock band featuring Rosemary Butler